Pierre Hébert (Villabé, 1804 – Paris, 1869) was a French sculptor. His son, Pierre-Eugène-Emile Hébert (1828–1893) and his daughter Hélène Bertaux were also sculptors.

Selected works 
 Boy playing with a tortoise (Enfant jouant avec une tortue), 1849, Louvre
 River of life (Fleuve de la vie), 1855, West facade of the Cour Carrée in the Louvre
 St. Genevieve, ca. 1860–1865, facade of the church Saint-Étienne-du-Mont in Paris
 Marshal Ney, before 1869, façade of the Louvre facing the Rivoli Street

External links

Hébert search results - Art and Architecture website
Amazon Preparing for Battle - National Gallery of Art, Washington, D.C.

1828 births
1893 deaths
19th-century French sculptors
French male sculptors
19th-century French male artists